Malar  is a panchayat village in the state of Rajasthan, India. Administratively, it is under Bap tehsil of Jodhpur District of Rajasthan.

There are three villages in the Malar gram panchayat: Malar, Godarli, and Reen.

Geography
Malar is in the Thar Desert and suffers extreme heat in the summers.

Godarli is located just 2 km by dirt road to the southeast.  Reen is located about 9 km by road north of Malar almost to the Agar Ka Rin (dry lake).

History
Malar sits at the center of the area formerly covered by the princely states of Jaisalmer, Bikaner and Jodhpur. Until 2009, Malar was part of Phalodi tehsil, at that point Bap Taluka was created out of northern Phalodi tehsil.

Demographics
In the India census of 2001, the village of Malar had a population of 943. Males constituted 501 (53.1%) of the population and females 442 (46.9%), for a gender ratio of 882 females per thousand males.

Notes

Villages in Jodhpur district